The ancient Egyptians regarded beauty as a sign of holiness. Everything they used had a spiritual aspect to it, including cosmetics. Both men and women wore makeup. Traders traded makeup often, especially in the upper classes. In tombs, cosmetic palettes were found buried in gold with the deceased as grave goods, which further emphasized the idea that cosmetics were not only used for aesthetic purposes but rather magical and religious purposes.

Chemistry
The two main forms of eye makeup were green eye paint and black kohl. The green eye paint called Udju  was made of malachite, a copper carbonate pigment. The green malachite came from the mines of Sinai as early as 3000 BC. The black eye-paint called Mesdemet  was made from galena, a dark grey ore. Crushed charcoal was also used in this process. The malachite and the galena were crushed and mixed with gum or water to make a paste. Mesdemet, or kohl, was used for lining the eyes and it revealed to bring along potent health benefits in the form of protection from disease, bugs and sun rays. Red ochre clay was ground up and mixed with water to create a paste to paint on the lips and cheeks.

Medical uses 
The ancient Egyptians created a remedy for burns by mixing the cheek and lip stain with red natron, northern salt, and honey. The Ebers Papyrus, a collection of Egyptian medical recipes dating to circa 1550 BC, shows the usual galena pigment could also be combined with specific ingredients to create eye paints that were intended to treat eye infection. Modern research suggests that the lead compounds found in these eye creams causes nitrogen monoxide overproduction in the body of the wearer. Nitrogen monoxide stimulates nonspecific immunological response, allowing the body to better fight off infection.

Cosmetic palettes and jars 
Cosmetic palettes were used to grind makeup. The earliest examples were rectangular in shape and date back to 5000 BC. The palettes later adopted a rounder shape like the Narmer Palette. King Narmer's palette was the earliest piece of its kind. It has decorations of the King smiting the enemies of Egypt and the unification of Upper and Lower Egypt, as well as a cavity for the grinding of cosmetics, making it a double purposed palette. These later developed into fish shaped palettes. They might have chosen the fish shape as the fish was a symbol of resurrection and new life. Tilapia are associated with fertility so the fish-shape could also refer to that. The fish shaped palettes were usually adorned with precious stones for royalty. These palettes have developed into baboon shaped containers to hold the kohl which held symbolic meanings for the ancient Egyptians.

Makeup tools 

The ancient Egyptians used many different tools to apply their makeup. Most commonly, they used a brush made from the Salvadora persica tree. They would also use a small stick to apply the kohl to their eyes. They often used a pad to apply powders to their face, and they used a reed with a piece of red ochre clay attached to the end to paint their lips.

Use in different social classes 
The use of cosmetics in ancient Egypt varied slightly between social classes, where more makeup was worn by higher class individuals as wealthier individuals could afford more cosmetics. Kohl was an expensive product that only members of the upper class could afford. The kohl that the lower class could afford came in sticks, whereas the kohl the upper class could afford was kept in ornately carved boxes made of precious materials.

See also
 Head cone
 Fish cosmetic palette

References 

 Bhanoo, Sindya N. "Ancient Egypt's Toxic Makeup Fought Infection, Researchers Say". The New York Times. Published LexisNexis Academic.
 Lucas A. "Cosmetics, Perfumes and Incense in Ancient Egypt" The Journal of Egyptian Archaeology, Vol. 16, No. 1/2 (May, 1930), pp. 41–53. Published by: Egypt Exploration Society, Stable URL: https://www.jstor.org/stable/3854332
 Manniche, Lise. Sacred Luxuries. 1999 Cornell University Press, New York. 127-143.
 Spotts, Peter N. "Early cosmetics". Christian Science Monitor (Boston, MA). Published LexisNexis Academic.
 Staff "How the Pharaohs Fought Ocular Infection". Review Of Optometry. http://www.revoptom.com/content/d/news_review/i/1018/c/19409/
 "Cosmetic Palette". A History of the World. BBC.co, http://www.bbc.co.uk/ahistoryoftheworld/objects/s-OMbtkESJ6aV6_k6o86oA
 "Egyptian Make Up" Published by: King TuT.org, https://web.archive.org/web/20120126015453/http://king-tut.org.uk/ancient-egyptians/egyptian-make-up.htm
 "Personal Hygiene and Cosmetics" Published by: reshafim.org, https://web.archive.org/web/20120507133925/http://www.reshafim.org.il/ad/egypt/timelines/topics/cosmetics.htm
 Shaath, Nadim A., ed. 2005. "Sunscreens: Regulations and Commercial Development. Third Edition."  ril

Further reading 

 Ribechini, Erika. "Discovering the Composition of Ancient Cosmetics and Remedies". Springer.
 Chaudhri, SK & NK Jain. "History of cosmetics". Asian Journal of Pharmaceutics.

Ancient Egypt
Beauty
History of cosmetics